Huddersfield Town's 1911–12 campaign was a season which saw Town's Football League adventure nearly be cut short after only 2 seasons. After only just escaping the threat of closure, Town finished in 17th place, but Gainsborough Trinity failed re-election and Town survived.

Squad at the start of the season

Review
Following their first full season in the Football League, Town under Dick Pudan were hoping to rise up the table to try to establish themselves as possible promotion candidates. However, promotion was never a realistic possibility with inconsistency proving to be Town's downfall in the season. This coupled with Town's off-field finances proved too much for the team to take and Town finished 17th place.

Squad at the end of the season

Results

Division Two

FA Cup

Appearances and goals

1911-12
English football clubs 1911–12 season